Crossplot may refer to:
 Cross-plot, a specialized chart
 Crossplot (film), a 1969 thriller starring Roger Moore